Dawn Atkins may refer to:

 Dawn Atkins (romantic novelist), American author of contemporary romance novels
 Dawn Atkins (anthropologist) (born 1962), American author, activist and educator